The Sacrifice is a post-apocalyptic young adult horror novel written by best-selling author Charlie Higson. The book, released by Puffin Books in the UK and Australia on 20 September 2012, is the fourth book in a planned seven-book series, titled The Enemy.  The Sacrifice takes place in London, a year after a worldwide sickness has infected adults, turning them into something akin to voracious, cannibalistic zombies, and begins five days after the end of The Fear.

Puffin Books released the first novel in the series, titled The Enemy, in the UK on 3 September 2009; Disney Hyperion released it in the US on 11 May 2010. Puffin Books released the second novel in the series, titled The Dead, on 16 September 2010; the third novel, titled The Fear, on 15 September 2011; the fourth novel, The Sacrifice, on 20 September 2012; the fifth novel, The Fallen, on 12 September 2013; the sixth novel, The Hunted, on 4 September 2014; and the final book, The End, on 10 November 2015. Disney Hyperion released Higson's short story companion book in the series, titled Geeks vs. Zombies, on 5 June 2012; it portrays an exclusive scene from The Fear, on World Book Day.

Summary
The book opens at an unknown period of time, where a child is locked in a dark room with an unseen figure (later revealed to be under a warehouse, near Saint Paul's Cathedral). The figure talks about how he "fell from the heavens" and landed in "the big green" where he "traveled" from insects to animals over thousands of years, eventually reaching humans. The figure then reveals himself to be a zombie capable of speech, before he devours the child.

The actual story picks up eight days after Small Sam and The Kid arrive at the Tower of London at the end of The Dead/The Enemy. The two boys are constantly teased for their resemblance to the children on the Angus Day Banner, whom they know nothing about. Sam begins to grow restless of his confinement, wishing to see his sister Ella. Jordan (still the Tower leader), calls a council to discuss a punishment for Brendan, Jessica's ex-boyfriend who was caught stealing food. After forcing Brendan to confess, Jordan sentences him to death.

Before Kyle executes Brendan, Jordan decides to reduce the punishment to exile. Brendan is kicked out of the fortress and wanders off through the so-called "No Go Zone", the heart of Old London where the zombies are said to be extremely dangerous. In response to Sam's complaints about the mockery from the other residents, Ed tells them about Matt and his Acolytes, stating they are keeping the two boys inside the tower for their own safety. Ed promises to put a party together and eventually take Sam to find Ella. Later whilst eating breakfast, some sentries spot a group of girls fleeing into a nearby pub after being chased by a horde. Ed and a few other kids, including Kyle, head to the pub and rescue a fourteen-year-old girl named Tish, who is strangely wearing all green clothes. In a moment of hesitation, Ed accidentally kills the other surviving member of Tish's group.

Tish is brought back to the Tower, and put in the same bunk room as Sam and The Kid. She tricks the two boys into believing that Jordan and Ed want to imprison them, and offers to take them across the city to find Ella, which they accept. The next morning, the trio start a small fire as a distraction, allowing them to escape into the No Go Zone. They are chased by a group of zombies and escape into the subway tunnels, which The Kid has significant knowledge of. After navigating their way through the subway system, they are cornered by more zombies, but are saved by a group of kids from Tish's group.

At the tower, the trio's disappearance is noticed, and Ed launches a search party consisting of himself, Kyle, two boys named Macca and Will, and two girls named Hayden and Adele. As they make their way through London, Kyle smashes a zombie's skull, and the group fail to notice a mass of moving grey slime that emerges from its head. They eventually wind up at the Houses of Parliament with Nicola, who develops a minor crush on Ed.

Meanwhile, Shadowman has been tracking the Fear consistently through the city, and is learning about their evolving organization. He learns that they have become more intelligent and established a chain of command with St. George and his remaining three lieutenants at the top. While spying on the Fear, he spots a group of three kids unaware of The Fear. He tries to warn them, but they are attacked and surrounded. Two of the kids, Johnny and Jaz, escape whilst the other one, Ricky, is eaten alive. Shadowman runs with the group to their car, and retrieves the keys from Ricky's pocket. They drive away, but Jaz crashes the car. Shadowman passes out and is rescued by Jaz's friends, who take him to their headquarters in an IKEA store. There, Shadowman meets the group's leader, Saif, and learns Jaz died, although Johnny survived.

Sam and The Kid are taken by their rescuers to their home, revealed to be St. Paul's Cathedral. It is revealed that the building is inhabited by Matt and his Acolytes, and that Tish and the boys' rescuers are members of Mad Matt's cult. They found out about Sam and The Kid via Brendan, who survived the No-Go Zone, and believe that the two boys are the "Lamb and Goat" on the Angus Day banner. After the boys are treated to a feast, they befriend a girl named Charlotte, who reveals that Matt gained respect from the kids at the Cathedral via taking control of a nearby warehouse filled with food. Matt's group eventually reveal their true intentions: they plan to figure out which of the boys is the "Goat", and sacrifice them so the "Lamb" can cleanse the earth of the "Nephilim" (the zombies). Unable to tell which of them is the Goat, Matt imprisons both. Eventually, the Kid tells Matt that he is the Goat, and is brutally whipped in an effort to get him to reveal his real name. The Kid initially refuses, until he lies and tells Matt his name is Angus Day. Matt believes this, and locks the Kid inside a cage, deciding to sacrifice him by feeding him to a zombie the people at the Cathedral call Wormwood (the figure from the start of the book). The Kid is locked in the same room as before, where he meets Wormwood. The Kid convinces Wormwood not to eat him, and they work together to escape through a tunnel.

Ed and the rest of his group discover the boy's location, whilst the Cathedral comes under siege from a huge horde of zombies. They fight their way into the building, where Ed rescues Sam and beats Matt for the Kid's location. Matt takes them to the warehouse, where they find Wormwood's room empty. Believing the Kid is dead, Ed's party, Sam, Charlotte and a few members of Matt's group run into an abandoned building to escape the continuing siege, and there find The Kid and Wormwood. Whilst Matt barricades himself inside the Cathedral with the rest of his followers, Wormwood helps Ed's group escape by communicating telepathically with the zombies. Brendan, Tish, and Adele die helping Ed's crew escape across the Wobbly Bridge. Ed decides to take Sam to The Natural History Museum, upon discovering that this is where Ella and the Holloway gang are currently located.

Shadowman, meanwhile, watches the demise of most of Jaz's group from a high vantage point, due to an ill-advised attack on the Fear ordered by Saif. He goes down to help a kid he believes is still alive, but is attacked by one of Saint Georges Lieutenants, Bluetooth. He attempts to flee on a gimpy leg, but Bluetooth catches up with him. He is saved when he runs into Ed's crew; with their assistance, he kills every zombie chasing him, including Bluetooth himself. He takes Ed's gang to a safe hiding spot, where he decides to reveal his real name to Ed; Dylan Peake. Ed and Dylan swap notes on St George and his army, and agree to deal with the issue later.

The book ends with Jordan declaring he will clear the No Go Zone, after learning of Ed's trip through London. We read reflections from Nicola, David, Jordan, Ed, and St. George himself about how things are beginning to change. Ed and The Kid believe Wormwood may be the key to stopping the entire apocalypse. It is made clear that Wormwood was a scientist studying parasitic rain forest diseases, and that he may be the first case of the virus' attacking a human. Wormwood repeats the phrase, "out with the bad blood, and in with the good", to The Kid.

Characters

The Tower of London
 Adele - She joins Ed's group when they go to rescue Sam. She dresses fully in pink and is a scary fighter. She dies during the battle on the Wobbly bridge.
 Ali - A girl in Ed's regiment at the Tower of London. She enjoys reading and being alone.
 Brendan Eldridge – A kid from the Tower of London who is exiled from the Tower by Jordan Hordern, for stealing canned peaches from the Tower's kitchen. He later tells Mad Matt that Small Sam and The Kid are staying at the Tower of London, and he sides with Ed after the sickos get into St. Paul's Cathedral, but later dies fighting the sickos on the Wobbly bridge, trying to buy Ed's group time.
 Carly - A lookout in Ed's regiment at the Tower of London.
 Ed Carter – The second in command at the Tower of London. He is 16 years old and was the main character in The Dead. He received a distinctive facial scar after being attacked with a meat cleaver by Greg Thorne, who is now St. George. Greg had formerly saved and driven Ed and his friends to London in The Dead.
 Hayden – She joins Ed's group when they go to rescue Sam. She is the fastest runner at the Tower. She later returns to the Tower and informs Jordan Hordern of everything they have seen.
 Jordan Hordern – The leader of the kids staying at the Tower of London. He is very interested in war and strategy and has ordered the kids in the Tower into certain regiments. It is revealed at the beginning of the book that he is slowly losing his eyesight.
 The Kid – A nine-year-old boy who befriended Small Sam after rescuing him from a couple of adults living in Kings Cross underground station. His real name is unknown. After he is turned over to Mad Matt, who believes The Kid is a religious figure known as the Goat, Matt sacrifices him to Wormwood. However, The Kid manages to survive and escape along with Wormwood, Small Sam, and Ed's group from the Tower.
 Kate - A lookout in Ed's regiment at the Tower of London.
 Keren - Temporary captain of the Pathfinders at the Tower of London, while Dognut is away.
 Kinsey - A fast runner at the Tower and one of Hayden's friends, who helps Ed rescue Tish from sickos.
 Kyle –  A boy Ed meets during a battle in The Dead. He serves as Ed's right-hand man at the Tower of London and joins Ed's group when they go to rescue Sam.
 Macca - He joins Ed's group when they go to rescue Sam. He is a good fighter.
 Partha -  A fast runner at the Tower and one of Hayden's friends, who helps Ed rescue Tish from sickos.
 Small Sam – A nine-year-old boy from Waitrose who is currently living in the Tower of London. Sam was separated from his sister, Ella, in The Enemy, when he was taken by a group of adults and is desperate to find her. After The Kid, Tish, and Small Sam leave the Tower, Tish takes them to St. Paul's Cathedral. Mad Matt believes Small Sam is The Lamb, a prominent figure in Matt's new religion. Sam is reunited with Ed at the end of the book.
 Tomoki Ford - Captain of the Tower Watch, and one of Jordan's closest associates. He was originally the leader of the group at the Tower.
 Will - He joins Ed's group when they go to rescue Sam. He is smart and often advises Ed.
 Zosia - The girlfriend of Brendan, who protests Jordan's decision to exile him.

St. Paul's Cathedral
 Archie Bishop – Mad Matt's second in command. He starts to lose faith in Mad Matt's religion as it gets more and more extreme. He is not very athletic and suffers from living in the smoke. His father was a vicar. His fate is unknown after the Cathedral is overrun.
 Charlotte - A small girl who plays the violin and befriends the Kid, who gives her the nickname Yo-Yo. She escapes with Ed's group when they come to rescue Sam and the Kid.
 Louise - A girl who accompanies Tish to find Small Sam and the Kid at the Tower of London. She and Tish are trapped, and her stomach is opened by sickos. She is accidentally killed by Ed when he brings a group to save them.
 Mad Matt – A boy from the Rowbridge church. Suffering from carbon monoxide poisoning and the emotional trauma from the disease epidemic, Matthew forms a religion about a boy known as "The Lamb" who make things right. He hijacks the sightseeing boat but crashes it, then floats downriver on its remains. He is now living at St. Paul's Cathedral with all of his followers, their numbers having grown in the year since he last saw Ed. When Small Sam and The Kid arrive and Tish takes them to the cathedral, Matt truly believes that the two are the Lamb and the Goat. Furthermore, Matthew says 'The Goat' must be sacrificed so 'The Lamb' will have no shadow. Matt's fate is unknown after the cathedral is overrun by grown-ups.
 Nathan – Matt's head of security at St Paul's Cathedral. His fate is unknown after the Cathedral is overrun. He is less interested in Matt's religion.
 Tish – A 14-year-old girl rescued from a pack of sickos by a group of kids led by Ed, outside the Tower of London. She is put into the house Small Sam and The Kid are staying in, and she convinces them to leave the Tower and look for Sam's sister, Ella. She is later revealed to be a part of Mad Matt's group at St. Paul's Cathedral but dies while fighting sickos on the Wobbly bridge, helping Ed's group.

IKEA
 Dan - A boy at IKEA, who seems more reasonable than Saif.
 Jaz – A girl Shadowman meets whilst tracking "The Fear". She is later dragged away by "The Fear" after her car crashes, with Johnny and Shadowman in the vehicle.
 Johnny – A member of Jaz's group and its sole survivor. He later makes it back to IKEA.
 Ricky – A member of Jaz's group who does not believe Shadowman's information about "The Fear" and is later devoured by them.
 Saif – The leader of the kids at IKEA. Shadowman warns him of "The Fear", whom Saif underestimates. Saif takes his best fighters to kill St. George's army of zombies, but he and his fighters are all apparently killed although he is not specifically shown to have died.

Houses of Parliament
 Bozo - A boy on guard duty at the gate. He wears a policeman's helmet which is too big for him and considers himself stupid. He was originally a member of the group at St. Paul's church but left after realizing Matt was insane. He stayed at Buckingham Palace for a while but left for Parliament upon realizing who David was. He informs Ed's group about Matt's group.
 Buzz Cut - A boy who tells Ed's group about Matt's group, and that Bozo came from Matt's group.
 Nicola - The leader of the group at Parliament, a teenage girl with flame red hair. When Ed's group arrives, she seems to take a liking to Ed, which Ed realizes. At the end, it is revealed she does have a crush on Ed, as well as that she knows David has a crush  on her, but she does not reciprocate.

Buckingham Palace
 David King - A megalomaniac, power-hungry fifteen-year-old, who is trying to unite all the kids of London under his rule, believing it is for the best. He intends to put the remains of the royal family back on the throne but finds this difficult when they all become sentinels.
 Pod - David's head of security at Buckingham Palace.

Other kids
 Ryan Aherne - The brutal leader of a group of hunters that roam the streets of London with a pack of dogs, killing sickos. He is around sixteen and has a face pockmarked with acne. He finds Ed's group in the no-go zone and brings them to Parliament. At the end, it is revealed he misses his family, and his old life, more than he lets on.
 Shadowman – A boy who spies on settlements throughout London. He tracks St. George (see below) across north London and watches him build up his army, which he names "The Fear". He knows St. George is going to become extremely dangerous but nobody he tries to warn, except for Ed and his crew, takes him seriously. His real name is Dylan Peake, but he tells the IKEA group his name is Carl.

Adults
 Bluetooth – One of the most intelligent zombies that herds the weakest and the slowest zombies. Bluetooth wears a suit and a bluetooth earpiece. At the end of the book, Bluetooth is killed by Shadowman.
 Man U – One of the more intelligent zombies in the Fear. Man U wears a Manchester United shirt and stays at Saint George's side throughout the novel. 
 Saint George/Greg Thorne – The zombie in the St. George shirt, previously known as Greg Thorne, who first appeared in The Dead. St. George is far more intelligent than most infected adults, even to the extent of remembering some words and memories, and retaining some ability to plan for the future. Saint George is revealed to have created a plan to hunt down and devour all children.
 Spike - One of the more intelligent zombies in the Fear. Spike has stuck in him a bolt from a crossbow with which Shadowman had shot him, which looks like a spike. He stays at Saint George's side throughout the novel.
 Stickboy - A male sicko, part of Bluetooth's gang which herds the weakest sickos. He walks with a stick. He is knocked over by the injured Shadowman, who manages to take his stick to help him walk, after severing Stickboy's fingers.
 Stumpy - A sentinel seen by Shadowman. He has only one hand, and flies buzz around the stump of the severed one, hence his nickname.
 Wormwood aka The Green Man- An intelligent adult covered in mould. Wormwood can think more clearly than he can talk – after a fashion. Among his weird ramblings it is revealed that he knows something about the cause and history of the disease, and was probably a scientist studying it when it occurred. He mentions having three sons and a daughter who "came out wrong". His real name is Mark Wormold, but the disease inside him causes him to see himself and Mark Wormold as two separate entities.

References

External links
Official website
Charlie Higson's website
Penguin Book's Page

2011 British novels
British horror novels
Post-apocalyptic novels
English novels
Books about sacrifice
Puffin Books books